The Women's Super-G World Cup 1986 involved 5 events.

Standings

References

External links
 

World Cup
FIS Alpine Ski World Cup women's Super-G discipline titles